The 2008 Southwestern Athletic Conference men's basketball tournament took place March 12–15, 2008, at Fair Park Arena in Birmingham, Alabama.

Format
The top eight eligible men's basketball teams in the Southwestern Athletic Conference receive a berth in the conference tournament.  After the conference season, teams are seeded by conference record.

Bracket

References

2007–08 Southwestern Athletic Conference men's basketball season
SWAC men's basketball tournament